Schifilliti is an Italian surname. Notable people with the surname include:

 Dean Schifilliti (born 1968), Australian rugby league footballer
 Giuseppe Schifilliti (born 1938) American mobster

Italian-language surnames